Sidney Robert Pert (born 1933) is an Australian former rugby league footballer who played in the 1950s.

Background
Sid Pert Jr. was the son of the former Glebe footballer, and St. George official, Sid Pert.

Playing career
Born and bred in Arncliffe, New South Wales, Sid Pert Jr came through the local Arncliffe Club to be graded with St George in 1952.   He went on to play four years of first grade league with St George between 1954–1957. 

Pert played 40 games with the club, and scored 11 tries during his career.  Sid Pert is retired and living in Queensland.

References

St. George Dragons players
Australian rugby league players
Living people
1933 births
Rugby league locks
Date of birth missing (living people)
Rugby league players from Sydney